Cottage pudding is a traditional American dessert consisting of a plain, dense cake served with a sweet glaze or custard. The glaze is generally cornstarch based and flavored with sugar, vanilla, chocolate, butterscotch, or one of a variety of fruit flavors such as lemon or strawberry.

History
One typical recipe is from Recipes Tried and True, a collection of recipes compiled in 1894 by the Ladies' Aid Society of the First Presbyterian Church in Marion, Ohio.

Cottage pudding can be baked over a fruit base, with a recipe from Fannie Farmer resulting in a dessert similar to a fruit cobbler, as in the recipe for Apple Pan Dowdy in The Fannie Farmer Cookbook.

Description

Cottage pudding is a simple single layer butter cake served with some kind of sauce poured over it. The sauce could be custard, hard sauce, butterscotch, chocolate sauce, whipped cream, or crushed fruits. 

There are many variations on the simple recipe. The traditional preparation is served as a one layer cake topped with fruit or custard, but the same batter can also be used for layer cakes, like banana layer cakes, which are filled with a layer of custard and sliced bananas, or as a substitute for sponge cake in traditional layer cake "pies" like the Washington pie or Boston cream pie, and other desserts like peach melba and baked Alaska. It could also be used to make ice cream sandwiches.

See also

 List of desserts

References

Puddings
Custard desserts
American cakes